Skweez Media is an American based on-demand Internet television network available worldwide that offers a large selection of new and classic pornography. The company was established in 2014 and is headquartered in Santa Monica, California.

History 
Launched on January 20, 2014, CNBC dubbed Skweez Media's platform "the iTunes of porn" for its delivery method. It has also been likened to Netflix, and credited as a potential solution for an industry suffering from lagging DVD sales.  Unlike most pornography sites, which use a subscription business model, Skweez Media offers access to its entire library for a non-recurring flat rate.  Skweez Media describes its network as a portal for "clean porn": licensed pornography from major studios that avoids adware, malware, annoying animated advertisements, recurring fees, and the collection of credit card details.  Skweez Media will offer original content (such as found on Hulu), including a 13-episode series.

References

External links 
 

Companies based in Santa Monica, California
2014 establishments in California
American companies established in 2014